Chris Heil is an English professional rugby league footballer who plays for the Hemel Stags in Betfred League 1.

In January 2018 he signed for the Hemel Stags.

References

1992 births
Living people
Doncaster R.L.F.C. players
English rugby league players
Hemel Stags players
Hull Kingston Rovers players
Newcastle Thunder players
Rugby league centres